was a Japanese television and film composer.  His work can be seen in such films as Arashi no Yoru ni and Piano no Mori. He died in 2011 at the age of 52.

Filmography 
Piano no Mori (2007)
Arashi no Yoru ni (2005)
Kenkaku Shobai Specials- Episode #1.1 (1998)
Concrete-Encased High School Girl Murder Case: Broken Seventeen-Year-Olds (1995) 
Einstein Roman (1991)

References

1959 births
2011 deaths
Japanese film score composers
Japanese male film score composers
Japanese television composers
Male television composers